Footlights and Shadows is a 1920 American silent drama film directed by John W. Noble and starring Olive Thomas and Ivo Dawson. It was shot at Fort Lee, New Jersey a major site of filmmaking until the rise of Hollywood.

Cast
 Olive Thomas as 	Gloria Dawn
 Alex Onslow as 	Jerry O'Farrell
 Ivo Dawson as 	Peter Shaw
 Mr. Farrell	as 	Doctor
 May Hicks as 	Colored Mammy
 E. Van Beusen as Mr. Johnson / Frank Reynolds
 A.H. Busby as Detective
 Robert Lee Keeling as 	Manager

References

Bibliography
 Goble, Alan. The Complete Index to Literary Sources in Film. Walter de Gruyter, 1999.

External links
 

1920 films
1920 drama films
1920s English-language films
American silent feature films
Silent American drama films
American black-and-white films
Films directed by John W. Noble
Selznick Pictures films
1920s American films